SUEU may refer to:

Salford University Engineers Union
Sydney University Evangelical Union